Heebie-jeebies is a phrase, widely attributed to Billy DeBeck, meaning  a feeling of anxiety, apprehension, depression or illness.

Heebie-jeebies or heebie jeebies may also refer to:

"Heebie Jeebies" (composition), a 1926 single by Louis Armstrong and his Hot Five
"Heeby-Jeebies", a 1956 single by Little Richard
"Heebiejeebies", a song on the album Good for You by Aminé featuring Kehlani
The Heebee-jeebees, an a capella band from Canada
The Hee Bee Gee Bees, a comedy parody of the Bee Gees
Heebie Jeebies (film), a 2013 science fiction horror film